was a town in Minamiakita District, Akita Prefecture, Japan.

On March 22, 2005, Iitagawa, Shōwa, and Tennō (all from Minamiakita District) merged to create the city of Katagami.

Noted people from Iitagawa
Yuki Kikuchi, basketball player

External links
 Katagami official website 

Dissolved municipalities of Akita Prefecture
Katagami, Akita